Taylor Peter Maloney (born 21 January 1999) is an English professional footballer who plays as a midfielder for Welling United.

Career
Maloney was born in Gravesend, Kent and raised in nearby Wilmington. He started his career with Charlton Athletic, joining the club at under-14 level. He started a two-year scholarship with the club in the summer of 2015 and went on to captain the side whilst being a second-year scholar. In May 2017, he signed his first professional contract after completing his scholarship. He made his professional debut for the side in an EFL Trophy group stage victory over Crawley Town in August 2017, replacing Andrew Crofts as a substitute.

On 9 March 2019, Maloney joined National League South side Concord Rangers on loan until 6 April 2019.

On 1 August 2019, Maloney joined Newport County on loan for the 2019–20 season. He made his debut for Newport on 13 August 2019 in the starting line up for the EFL Cup first round win against Gillingham. On 12 November 2019 he scored his first goals for Newport, a hat-trick in the 7-4 EFL Trophy win against Cheltenham Town. On 3 January 2020, Maloney was recalled from his loan by Charlton.

On 14 February 2020, Maloney rejoined Concord Rangers on loan.

On 2 July 2020, it was confirmed that Maloney had left Charlton after his contract expired.

On 5 October 2020, Maloney joined Bromley.

In September 2021, he dropped down two divisions to sign for Isthmian League Premier Division side Lewes on a free transfer.

On 24 June 2022, Maloney joined Welling United.

Career statistics

References

External links

Taylor Maloney at My Football Database

1999 births
Living people
Sportspeople from Gravesend, Kent
English footballers
Association football midfielders
Charlton Athletic F.C. players
Concord Rangers F.C. players
Newport County A.F.C. players
Lewes F.C. players
Welling United F.C. players
English Football League players
National League (English football) players
Isthmian League players
People from Wilmington, Kent